Prionocera is a genus of true crane fly.

Species
P. abscondita Lackschewitz, 1933
P. byersi Brodo, 1987
P. chosenicola Alexander, 1945
P. cryptica Brodo, 1987
P. dimidiata (Loew, 1866)
P. electa Alexander, 1927
P. mannheimsi Savchenko, 1983
P. naskapi Brodo, 1987
P. ominosa (Alexander, 1920)
P. oregonica Alexander, 1943
P. pubescens Loew, 1844
P. recta Tjeder, 1948
P. ringdahli Tjeder, 1948
P. serenicola Alexander, 1945
P. serricornis (Zetterstedt, 1838)
P. setosa Tjeder, 1948
P. sordida (Loew, 1863)
P. subserricornis (Zetterstedt, 1851)
P. subturcica Savchenko, 1983
P. turcica (Fabricius, 1787)
P. unimicra (Alexander, 1915)
P. woodorum Brodo, 1987

References

Tipulidae
Diptera of Europe
Taxa named by Hermann Loew